Educational Practice and Theory is a bi-annual, peer-reviewed academic journal focused on education. The journal focuses on the theoretical and practical elements of the field of education. The journal is published in Australia by James Nicholas Publishers.

See also
 List of education journals
 Educational psychology

External links
 Official page

References

Education journals
English-language journals
Biannual journals